Západ (román) is a Czech novel, written by Karel Václav Rais. It was first published in 1896.

1896 Czech novels